Luan Muller Barboza (born 17 March 1993) is a Brazilian born, Armenian futsal player who plays as a goalkeeper for Palma Futsal and the Armenian national futsal team.

References

External links
LNFS profile

1993 births
Living people
Futsal goalkeepers
Sportspeople from São Paulo